The 2008 FIFA Beach Soccer World Cup CONMEBOL qualifier, also later and commonly known as the 2008 South American Beach Soccer Championship, was the second Beach Soccer World Cup qualification championship for South America, held from April 23–27 in Buenos Aires, Argentina.

The qualifiers were not coordinated by CONMEBOL at the time. The event was organised by Beach Soccer Worldwide (BSWW), under the FIFA Beach Soccer World Cup Qualifier title. CONMEBOL began recognising the tournaments in 2013, under the title South American Beach Soccer Championship, also acknowledging the 2006–11 events as historic editions of the championship. CONMEBOL eventually began organising the qualifiers in 2017, under a new title.

Brazil won the championship for a second consecutive time, with Argentina finishing second and Uruguay winning the third place play of to finish third. The three nations moved on to play in the 2008 FIFA Beach Soccer World Cup in Marseille, France, from July 17–27.

Participating nations

Group stage

Group A

Group B

Knockout stage

Semi-finals

Third Place Play Off

Final

Winners

Awards

Final standings

References

Beach Soccer Championship
 Sports competitions in Buenos Aires
FIFA Beach Soccer World Cup qualification (CONMEBOL)
2008
2008 in beach soccer